Panagiotis Iliopoulos (born 30 March 1978, Athens) is a Greek former member of parliament for Golden Dawn.

In 2014 he was arrested for the first time and put into pre-trial detention for 18 months after the murder of Pavlos Fyssas.

He left the party after it failed to enter parliament in the 2019 Greek legislative election, together with various other members.

In 2020, Golden Dawn was deemed by the courts to be a criminal organisation, and he was convicted as a member and a leader of it. He was sentenced to 7 years in jail.

References

External links
Personal blog

Living people
1978 births
Greek MPs 2012–2014
Golden Dawn (political party) politicians